Walter was Bishop of Wrocław, Poland between 1149 and 1169.

Little is known about his origins, career, or his episcopal work. He was a Walloon from the area of Namur and during his tenure as bishop, the Premonstratensians founded the St. Martin church, he also dedicated a Marienkirche, undertook some construction at Wrocław Cathedral and Lehnhaus castle was built (1155).

Bishops of Wrocław
12th-century Roman Catholic bishops in Poland
People from Namur (province)